Gitta Gradova (1904 – April 26, 1985), also known as Gitta Cottle and Gertrude Weinstock, was an American pianist.

Early life
Gitta Gradova (birth name Gertrude Weinstock) was born in Chicago, the youngest child of Joseph and Sonya Weinstock. Her parents were both Russian Jewish immigrants to the United States; Gertrude was their only American-born child. Her father, Joseph Weinstock, was a rabbi by profession; both of her parents had been actors in Yiddish theatre when young. Identified as a musical talent in childhood she was already performing as a soloist in Chicago before her teens. Her teacher in Chicago from age 7 was Esther Harris Dua. Gradova was sent to New York at age 13, to study piano with Sergei Prokofiev.

Career
At 19, Gitta Gradova performed with the New York Philharmonic Orchestra. She was a friend of Sergei Rachmaninoff and Vladimir Horowitz; Arturo Toscanini praised her work. "Miss Gradova is a pianist whose own brilliancy, accuracy, and forcefulness become a transforming medium for what she plays," wrote a Chicago critic in 1931. She toured in Europe in 1935, and was featured at the Chicago's outdoor Ravinia Festival in 1938 and 1941.

Although she retired from performing in 1942, she never stopped practicing daily at home; she taught piano, and played for guests and friends, according to her son. At the time of her death, she was planning a return to the concert stage, to play Rachmaninoff's First Piano Concerto with the Chicago Symphony under James Levine.  It is said in her son's memoir, that she had confided in one of her grandchildren that she was nervous about the performance.

Personal life
She married a doctor, Maurice Cottle. They lived in Chicago, and had two children, Thomas and Judy; both earned PhDs and Judy became a cabaret singer in New York. Gitta Gradova died in 1985, aged 80, in Chicago. Her son Thomas Cottle wrote a memoir about her, When the Music Stopped: Discovering my Mother (SUNY Press 2004). Several recordings of her playing, including a private 1950 recording of Gradova and Horowitz playing a Mozart piano duet, are now available online.

References

External links
 "A Mother's Musical Sacrifice" (2004), an interview with Thomas Cottle about his mother, from National Public Radio.

1904 births
1985 deaths
American women classical pianists
American classical pianists
Musicians from Chicago
American people of Russian-Jewish descent
20th-century American women pianists
20th-century American pianists
20th-century classical pianists
Classical musicians from Illinois